Liverpool College is a school in Mossley Hill, Liverpool, England. It was one of the thirteen founding members of the Headmasters' Conference (HMC).

History

Liverpool College was the first of many public schools founded in the Victorian Era. The foundation stone of the original building was laid on 22 October 1840 by Edward Smith-Stanley, 14th Earl of Derby K.G. (then styled the Rt. Hon. Lord Stanley MP), the first patron of the college.  A group of Christian Liverpool citizens, many of whose names are now famous in the annals of the city, then began the building of a school where education might be combined with 'sound religious knowledge'. The original building in Shaw street (now apartments) is in the so-called Tudor-Gothic style.  It was designed by Mr. Harvey Lonsdale Elmes, and was erected at a cost of £35,000.

The college was opened on 6 January 1843 by the Right Hon. William Ewart Gladstone (afterwards four time Prime Minister of the United Kingdom) and the same distinguished son of Liverpool showed his interest in the college by delivering a second great speech in the hall on founders' day in 1857. The College consisted of 3 institutions – Upper, Middle and Lower Schools.  While these schools were under the control of one and the same Principal, they were kept entirely separate. The Lower, or Commercial School, was intended for boys who were to go into business houses at an early age.  The Middle School combined literary and scientific training, with special attention to modern languages for boys leaving for business or the professions. The Upper School was a first grade public school with leaving exhibitions for Oxford and Cambridge.  Though the schools were distinct in theory and fact, the foundation was unique, in that the Principal was empowered to nominate a certain number of promising boys for entrance to a higher school on the terms of the lower.

The Liverpool College for Girls at Grove Street was established in 1856.  The Liverpool College for Girls, Huyton, or Huyton College as it was popularly known, was started in 1894 and intended to be parallel to the Boys Upper School.  The Liverpool College Preparatory School at Fairfield was also founded in 1898.  The Council of Liverpool College was therefore one of the most important governing bodies in the kingdom, with 6 schools under its control.

Liverpool College has occupied three sites since its foundation in 1840, unusual for a public school. The Upper School of what was then officially called 'Liverpool Collegiate' (since 1863), was moved from Shaw Street to Lodge Lane, Sefton Park in 1884 through the efforts of Rev. Selwyn. The erection of new school buildings started in 1887 and were completed in 1890.  The first instance of a site in Mossley Hill occurred in 1896 where several acres were purchased as playing fields with the present pavilion being built in 1905. All ties with the Original building were severed in 1907 when it was sold to the Liverpool Corporation, and the masters and boys of the Middle and Lower schools remained to form the Liverpool Collegiate School.  From 1917 to 1936 more land and buildings were purchased at the Site in Mossley Hill.  The Junior wing (presently Mossley Vale) was opened by Lord Stanley and the foundation stone of St.Peter's chapel was laid by Mr. H. Sutton Timmis, Chairman of the governors.

The college has held land on the present 26 acre (105,000 m2) site since 1896. In 1993 the Liverpool College for Girls, Huyton or Huyton College merged with Liverpool College to become a coeducational day school.

The school is situated in Mossley Hill on North Mossley Hill Road and backing onto Queens Drive. Facilities on site include a fully equipped gymnasium and relaxation centre as well as AstroTurf courts and a Combined Cadet Force centre. It had been decided to proceed with plans to concentrate the whole school in what is currently the Lower School site, in a series of projects to construct newer and more up-to-date buildings. However, due to having planning permission rejected and also the financial situation, these plans were shelved indefinitely and instead a gradual programme of wholesale refurbishment of the school began in 2009.

In September 2013 the school formally became an Academy, an independent school that is funded by central government, and therefore non-fee paying.

Boarding and international school
In September 2010, Liverpool College became a boarding school once again. As a consequence, the College extended its provision to include international students. However, when the school became an academy in 2013, boarding places at the school were now only available for UK and EU nationals. The school has become, therefore, one of the few state boarding schools in England.

However Liverpool College International is a separate fee-paying international school located on the Liverpool College campus which is primarily for international students. The international school is set in its own buildings at the campus, but leases some of Liverpool College's facilities.

Constitution
Liverpool College is a registered charity and its objects are "to provide for the inhabitants of Liverpool and others, by the establishment and maintenance of Lectures, School, and other like means, an education suited to their wants upon the most moderate terms; and for this purpose instruction in the doctrines and duties of Christianity, as taught by the Church of England, shall be forever communicated, in combination with literary, scientific, and commercial information."

In 2006-7 it had a gross annual income of £6,803,367.

Houses
Until 1992 the school was organised under a clearly defined house system, as in most public schools. In the same year two of the previous houses were removed and the school was re-organised into year groups in lieu of the traditional house structure that had existed: School House (the college's boarding house since 1917) and Howard were removed while Brook, Butler, Howson and Selwyn Houses remained.

In addition, the Lower School had its own house system for many years, named for some of the notable alumni such as Chavasse and Glazebrook.  There was also a section of the school named David House for younger pupils aged 5 to 9 years old.

In 2009, the College returned to its old (Upper School) House System. The four remaining houses were re-instated and gave the school a new lease of life.  Each house now has its own large house room in which Lerpoolians can socialise, study and leave their belongings.  House activities have once again become a daily occurrence and pupils are registered in house groups meaning that the year system brought about in 1992 has almost vanished. In 2017, the college returned the two houses which were not reinstated in 2009 due to the college growing numbers.

Combined Cadet Force
Liverpool College has an active Combined Cadet Force (CCF) Contingent.  Through the Cadet Vocational Qualifications Organisation (CVQO) the College CCF offers cadets (aged 13–18) and above the opportunity to gain internationally recognised BTEC First Diploma qualifications in Public Services. Each BTEC First Diploma is the equivalent of 4 GCSEs, grade C - A*.  Liverpool College CCF also offers the Duke of Edinburgh Award from Bronze to Gold and sees a number of cadets successfully complete the awards every year.

Notable Old Lerpoolians

Military honours
 Noel Chavasse VC & Bar, MC – One of only three people to have ever been awarded the Victoria Cross and Bar
 Walter G. R. Hinchliffe – Royal Naval Air Service and Royal Air Force flying ace in World War I, awarded the Distinguished Flying Cross
 Ronald Niel Stuart – World War I Victoria Cross recipient
 Alfred Stowell Jones – VC recipient for services during the Indian Rebellion of 1857
 Sir Charles William Wilson KCB - Director‑General of the Ordnance Survey and Director‑General of the Military Education
 Derek Mills-Roberts CBE, DSO and bar, MC. Commando Leader
 John Mungo-Park DFC and Bar, Battle of Britain Ace and Commanding Officer No. 74 Squadron Killed in action 1941
 Harold Bird-Wilson CBE DSO DFC* AFC*

Legal and political
 Ellis William Davies – Politician and Lawyer
 Sir William Francis Kyffin Taylor, Baron Maenan – Barrister and Judge
 Edward Russell, 2nd Baron Russell of Liverpool – Historian and lawyer
 John Stopford, Baron Stopford of Fallowfield – Peer
 David Hunt, Baron Hunt of Wirral – Politician
 Rt Hon. Sir John Rigby (politician) – Q.C., P.C., M.P., Attorney General for England and Wales and Lord Justice of Appeal
 Rt Hon. Sir Brian Leveson – Lord Justice of Appeal and Senior Presiding Judge for England and Wales
 William Pickford, 1st Baron Sterndale – Lord Justice of Appeal and Master of the Rolls
 Jake Berry – Conservative MP for Rossendale and Darwen
 Stephen McPartland – Conservative MP for Stevenage
 Kit Malthouse Conservative MP for North West Hampshire
 Sir Henry Globe – Recorder of Liverpool and High Court Judge
 Sir Andrew Edis – Lord Justice of Appeal

Mayors and Lord Mayors of Liverpool
 1877 – Sir Arthur Forwood, 1st Baronet P.C – Merchant and Politician
 1878 – Sir Thomas Royden, 1st Baronet – M.P., J.P., High Sheriff of Cheshire, father of Baron Royden
 1880 – Sir William Bower Forwood
 1890 – Joseph Bond Morgan
 1897 – John Houlding – Founder of Liverpool F.C
 1899 – William Oulton
 1902 – Sir Robert A. Hampson
 1910 – S. Mason Hutchinson
 1959 – Herbert Neville Bewley C.B.E.

Religious
 The Rt Rev. Christopher Chavasse O.B.E., M.C – Lord Bishop of Rochester
 The Rt Rev. David Saunders-Davies – 2nd Lord Bishop of Stockport
 The Rt Rev. Charles Lisle Carr – 107th Lord Bishop of Hereford
 The Rt Rev. Nigel McCulloch – 11th Lord Bishop of Manchester
 The Rt Rev. Llwelyn Jones – Bishop of Newfoundland
 The Rt Rev. Sir Robert Stopford K.C.V.O., C.B.E – 33rd Lord Bishop of Peterborough and 128th Lord Bishop of London
 The Very Rev. Sir Armitage Robinson K.C.V.O – Dean of Westminster and later of Wells

Sports
 Kenneth Cranston – Cricketer
 Abi Ekoku – Athlete and Rugby player
 Efan Ekoku – Footballer
 Curtis Robb – Athlete
 William Charles Cuff – Everton FC Chairman, Chairman Football League.
 Guy Edwards – F1 Driver – Queen's Award for Gallantry
 Peter Johnson – First-class cricketer
 Kenneth Siviter – First-class cricketer

The arts
 Katy Carmichael – Actress
 Bernard Falk – TV producer/presenter
 Deryck Guyler – Actor
 Sir Rex Harrison – Actor
 Stephen Jones – Milliner
 Richard Le Gallienne – Author, poet, publisher
 Mathew Murphy – Musician
 Sir Simon Rattle – Conductor
 Sir Ken Robinson – Author
 Sir Richard Stilgoe – Entertainer/lyricist
 Ronald Symond – Author
 Elton Welsby – TV presenter
 Brian Epstein – Beatles manager

Other
 John Baker – Oxford academic, Lord Mayor of Oxford and father of Janet Young
 T. K. Bellis – Merchant, the "turtle king"
 Roger Bennett – Journalist, football pundit and TV Personality
 Brian Blackwell – murderer
 Sir John Esplen – Shipbuilder
 Robson Fisher – Headmaster
 Sir Richard Glazebrook KCB KCVO FRS – Physicist
 George William Parker – 1860–1926, Chief Officer of the Manchester Fire Brigade and "architect of the world's fire service".
 Sir Charles Petrie, 3rd Baronet – Historian and son of Liverpool Lord Mayor, Sir Charles Petrie
 Richard Smethurst – Oxford academic
 R. B. Whitehead – numismatist
William Renner (surgeon), cancer researcher and surgeon
Peter West (physicist), theoretical physicist
Gustav Wolff - partner Harland & Wolff , Shipbuilders

References

Further reading
David Wainwright (1960) Liverpool gentlemen: A history of Liverpool College, an independent day school, from 1840 (Faber)

External links
 
 

Educational institutions established in 1840
 
Secondary schools in Liverpool
Church of England secondary schools in the Diocese of Liverpool
Church of England primary schools in the Diocese of Liverpool
Boarding schools in Merseyside
1840 establishments in England
Primary schools in Liverpool
Academies in Liverpool